Edward Octavian Cuthbert (December 3, 1826 – July 28, 1890) was a Quebec politician of independent means. He represented Berthier in the House of Commons of Canada as a Conservative member from 1875 to 1887.

He was born in Berthier, Lower Canada in 1826, the son of James Cuthbert and Mary-Louise Amable Cairns, and was educated at Chambly College. He served as mayor of Berthier from 1868 to 1873 and from 1877 to 1878. Cuthbert was also president of the County Agricultural Society. He ran unsuccessfully for a seat in the Quebec assembly in 1867. He was elected to the House of Commons in an 1875 by-election held after the sitting member was named to the Senate.

In 1853, Cuthbert married Mary Bostwick. In 1849, he had inherited the seigneury of Berthier of which he was the last seigneur.

Electoral record 

{{Canadian federal election, 1882/Berthier}

References 

1826 births
1890 deaths
Members of the House of Commons of Canada from Quebec
Conservative Party of Canada (1867–1942) MPs
Mayors of places in Quebec